"Sunflower" is a song written by Neil Diamond and recorded by American country music singer Glen Campbell. It was released in June 1977 as the second single from Campbell's 1977 album, Southern Nights.  "Sunflower" was the last of eight number ones on the Easy Listening chart for Campbell.  The single spent one week at number one and peaked at number 39 on the Billboard Hot 100.  "Sunflower" peaked at number four on the US country chart.

Neil Diamond did not release his own version of this song until late 2018, when it was included the release of his 50th Anniversary Collectors Edition 6-CD set.

Chart performance

Weekly charts

Year-end charts

See also
List of number-one adult contemporary singles of 1977 (U.S.)

References

1977 songs
1977 singles
Glen Campbell songs
Neil Diamond songs
Songs written by Neil Diamond
Song recordings produced by Gary Klein (producer)
Capitol Records singles
Songs about flowers